Laleu is a commune in the Orne department in north-western France.

Population

See also
Communes of the Orne department
Normandie-Maine Regional Natural Park

References

Communes of Orne